The Curtiss-Wright X-19, company designation Model 200, was an American experimental tiltrotor aircraft of the early 1960s. It was noteworthy for being the last aircraft of any kind manufactured by Curtiss-Wright.

Design and development
In March 1960 the Curtiss-Wright Corporation developed the X-100, a prototype for a new, vertical takeoff transport aircraft. The X-100 had a single turboshaft engine, which propelled two tilting-propellers, while at the tail swivelling nozzles used the engine's exhaust gases to give additional control for hovering or slow flight. Although sometimes classified as a tiltrotor aircraft, the design differed from the Bell VTOL XV tiltrotor designs. The X-19 utilized specially designed radial lift propellers, rather than helicopter-like rotors, for vertical takeoff and augmenting the lift provided by the wing structures.

From the X-100 Curtiss-Wright developed the larger X-200, of which the United States Air Force ordered two prototypes designated the X-19A.

The X-19 had fore and aft high-mounted tandem wings. Each wing mounted two  propellers that could be rotated through 90 degrees, allowing the aircraft to take off and land like a helicopter. The propellers were driven by twin Avco Lycoming T55-L-5 turboshaft engines mounted in the fuselage.

Operational history
The first flight of the X-19 took place in November 1963 (other sources give 26 June 1964). It was intended that the X-19 would be developed into a VTOL transport aircraft. However the first X-19 was destroyed in a crash on 25 August 1965, with no loss of life, and the program was subsequently cancelled; the second prototype was never completed. The second X-19 prototype is currently being stored in the restoration facilities at the National Museum of the United States Air Force in Dayton, Ohio.

The power transmission, power to weight requirements, flight mode transition and multi-axis control make VTOL aircraft design far more problematic than conventional fixed wing and even helicopter design. Like most pioneering tilt aircraft, the aerodynamic complexity of coupled pitch, roll, and yaw, and  torque, particularly in transition from vertical takeoff to horizontal flight, made design of the X-19 extremely challenging. Ultimately, weaknesses in the power transmission gear boxes led to failure. Owing to design complexity, tiltrotor VTOL aircraft did not enter operational service until the Bell-Boeing V-22 Osprey introduction in 2007.

Specifications (X-19)

See also

References

External links

 Curtiss-Wright X-19 Background

Tandem-wing aircraft
Tiltrotor aircraft
X-19, Curtiss-Wright
X-19
Quadrotors
Aircraft first flown in 1963